Isthmia may refer to:

 Isthmia (sanctuary) at the east side of the Isthmus of Corinth, Greece
 The ancient Isthmian Games, held at the sanctuary
 Temple of Isthmia, located in the sanctuary 
 Isthmia, Corinthia, a village in the municipal unit Loutraki-Perachora, Corinthia, Greece, near ancient Isthmia
 Isthmia (genus), a genus of diatom in the Coscinodiscophyceae subclass